This is a list of public art in Nashville, Tennessee, in the United States. This list applies only to works of public art on permanent display in an outdoor public space. For example, this does not include artworks in museums. Public art may include sculptures, statues, monuments, memorials, murals, and mosaics.

Nashville, Tennessee
Nashville
Nashville
Public art